Yanique Thompson (born 12 March 1996) is a Jamaican hurdler. She competed in the women's 100 metres hurdles at the 2017 World Championships in Athletics. In July 2021, she qualified to represent Jamaica at the 2020 Summer Olympics.

References

External links
 

1996 births
Living people
Jamaican female hurdlers
World Athletics Championships athletes for Jamaica
Place of birth missing (living people)
Commonwealth Games medallists in athletics
Commonwealth Games bronze medallists for Jamaica
Athletes (track and field) at the 2018 Commonwealth Games
Athletes (track and field) at the 2019 Pan American Games
Pan American Games competitors for Jamaica
Athletes (track and field) at the 2020 Summer Olympics
Olympic athletes of Jamaica
Medallists at the 2018 Commonwealth Games